Michael Douglas Hawkins (born November 29, 1955) is a former professional American football player who played linebacker for five seasons for the New England Patriots and Los Angeles Raiders.

References 

1955 births
Living people
People from Bay City, Texas
Players of American football from Texas
American football linebackers
Texas A&M–Kingsville Javelinas football players
New England Patriots players
Los Angeles Raiders players